The Engel identity, named after Friedrich Engel, is a mathematical equation that is satisfied by all elements of a Lie ring, in the case of an Engel Lie ring, or by all the elements of a group, in the case of an Engel group. The Engel identity is the defining condition of an Engel group.

Formal definition 
A Lie ring  is defined as a nonassociative ring with multiplication that is anticommutative and satisfies the Jacobi identity with respect to the Lie bracket , defined for all elements  in the ring . The Lie ring  is defined to be an n-Engel Lie ring if and only if
 (n copies of ), is satisfied.

See also
 Adjoint representation
 Efim Zelmanov
 Engel's theorem

References

Group theory
Lie algebras